Chamberlain is a village or populated centre of Tacuarembó Department, in northern Uruguay. It is connected by railway with the city of Paysandú.

Population
In 2011 Chamberlain had a population of 52.
 
Source: Instituto Nacional de Estadística de Uruguay

References

External links
INE map of Chamberlain

Populated places in the Tacuarembó Department